Suchecki (feminine: Suchecka) is a Polish surname. Notable people with this surname include:

Ignacy Suchecki (died 1803), Polish nobleman and military leader
Jim Suchecki (1926–2000), Major League Baseball pitcher
Zbigniew Suchecki (born 1984), Polish speedway rider
Teresa Suchecka-Nowak (1926–2011), Polish World War II underground fighter

Polish-language surnames